The Wickenburg Massacre was the November 5, 1871, murder of six stagecoach passengers en route westbound from Wickenburg, Arizona Territory, headed for San Bernardino, California, on the La Paz road.

Massacre
Around mid-morning, about six miles from Wickenburg, the stagecoach was allegedly attacked by 15 Yavapai warriors, who were sometimes mistakenly called Apache-Mohaves, from the Date Creek Reservation. Six men, including the driver, were shot and killed. Among them was Frederick Wadsworth Loring, a young writer from Boston working as a correspondent for Appleton's Journal and assigned to cover a cartographic expedition led by Lieutenant George Wheeler. One male passenger, William Kruger, and the only female passenger, Mollie Sheppard, managed to escape. According to Kruger, Sheppard eventually died of the wounds she received.

Memorial plaques have been installed near the site several times, including in 1937 by the Arizona Highway Department and in 1948 and 1988 by the Wickenburg Saddle Club.
The Wickenburg Massacre was featured on a April 12, 1996, episode of Unsolved Mysteries.

See also

 List of massacres in Arizona

References

Further reading
 
 Dan L. Thrapp: Al Sieber: Chief of Scouts. University of Oklahoma Press, Norman 1964,  pp. 87–105
 Another account of the massacre from University of Arizona
 Bill W. Smith.  A Collection of Newspaper Articles, Letters, and Reports, Regarding the Wickenburg Massacre and Subsequent Camp Date Creek Incident. Phoenix: Privately Published, 1989. 68 pp. ,

External links
  a proposed archeological investigation

Arizona Territory
Native American history of Arizona
Murder in Arizona
Massacres by Native Americans
Apache Wars
Crimes in Arizona Territory
November 1871 events
1871 in Arizona Territory
La Paz–Wikenburg Road